Scopula elegans is a moth of the  family Geometridae. It is found in Malawi, Nigeria and Uganda.

References

Moths described in 1915
elegans
Insects of West Africa
Insects of Uganda
Moths of Africa